The Commonwealth Cup is an annual independent wrestling tournament in North America, run and promoted by Virginia-based promotion NOVA Pro Wrestling. The first tournament took place in 2017, and serves as the highest honor in the promotion, as there are no official championships in NOVA Pro at the present time.

Format 
The first year of the Commonwealth Cup, in 2017, consisted of 12 participants, with six opening round singles matches, two three-way elimination semifinal matches, and a one-on-one tournament final. In 2018, the men's tournament was expanded to 16 participants, with eight opening round singles matches, four second round singles matches, and one four-way elimination final.

In 2018, the Commonwealth Cup featured its first women's tournament. The tournament was an 8-woman single-elimination format.

List of winners 
2017: Logan Easton Laroux
2018 Men's: Wheeler YUTA
2018 Women's: Jordynne Grace

Results

2017 
The first annual Commonwealth Cup was held on April 14, 2017, in Fairfax, Virginia.

Both semifinal matches were elimination matches.  Sterling pinned Kermon, then LaRoux pinned Sterling, in Semifinal 1.  In Semifinal 2, Shields pinned Donst, then Royal pinned Shields.

2018 men's 
The 2018 men's Commonwealth Cup was held on June 8 & 9, 2018 in Fairfax, Virginia.

Note on the Semis/Finals: The final four squared off in a four corners elimination match for the Commonwealth Cup.  Times listed are the times of elimination.  Royal pinned Williams; Royal pinned Phillips; YUTA made Royal submit.

2018 women's 
The 2018 women's Commonwealth Cup will be held on June 9, 2018, in Fairfax, Virginia.

Announced participants

Note: If two names are listed in the "Qualified over" column, the person won a triple threat to qualify.

The Deal With the Devil: Angelus Layne was allowed to skip qualification and enter the Women's Commonwealth Cup after injury kept her from competing; however, in doing so, she agreed to put her NOVA Pro career on the line in her first-round match.

Tournament Results

2019 men's

The following wrestlers will take part in the 2019 Men's Commonwealth Cup.  If the wrestler entered the tournament via qualifier, the opponent(s) he beat are noted.

 Daniel Makabe
 Slim J
 Shotzi Blackheart or Tripp Cassidy (qualified over Eddy Only, Innocent Isaiah, John Kermon, Mikey Banker, and Steve Manders)
 Anthony Greene (qualified over Tim Donst)
 Winner Of: Cabana Man Dan vs. Josh Briggs

NOTE: Tripp Cassidy could not make his qualifier, but nominated Blackheart to represent him in the match.  When Blackheart won, there was controversy over who officially qualified.

2019 women's

The following wrestlers will take part in the 2019 Women's Commonwealth Cup.  If the wrestler entered the tournament via qualifier, the opponent(s) she beat are noted.

 Rain
 Shazza McKenzie
 Winner Of: Kasey Catal vs. Quinn McKay vs. Gemma Cross vs. ??? vs. ??? vs. ???

See also 
List of independent wrestling promotions in the United States
Independent wrestling

References

Professional wrestling tournaments
Professional wrestling in Virginia